The South African Futures Exchange (Safex) is the futures exchange subsidiary of JSE Limited, the Johannesburg-based exchange.  It consists of two divisions; a financial markets division for trading of equity derivatives and an agricultural markets division (AMD) for trading of agricultural derivatives.

Safex was formed in 1990 as an independent exchange and experienced steady growth over the following decade.  In 1995 a separate agricultural markets division was formed for trading of agricultural derivatives.  The exchange continued to make steady progress despite intensifying competition from international derivative exchanges and over-the-counter alternatives.  By 1997 Safex reserves have grown sufficiently to allow a significant reduction in the fees it levies per future or options contract.  Consequently, all fees were reduced by 50 per cent that year and in the changes on allocated trades were removed.  In 2001 the exchange was acquired by the JSE Securities Exchange, with the JSE agreeing to keep the Safex branding.

The exchange is a Self Regulatory Authority and exercises its regulatory functions in terms of the Financial  Markets Control Act, 1989 and its rules.  The Exchange, in turn, is supervised by FSB.

Historical development

See also
Alternative Exchange
Bond Exchange of South Africa
Johannesburg Stock Exchange
List of futures exchanges
List of stock exchanges
List of African stock exchanges
South African Institute of Financial Markets

External links 
Safex, www.safex.co.za
Safex Option Pricing, www.quantonline.co.za

Finance in South Africa
Companies based in Johannesburg
Commodity exchanges
Futures exchanges